The Rt Rev Edward Barry Henderson DSC (22 March 1910 – 12 June 1986) was Bishop of Bath and Wells from 1960 to 1975.

The son of Edward Henderson, former Dean of Salisbury, Henderson was born in Derby and educated at Radley and Trinity College, Cambridge (BA 1931, MA 1942). He trained for ordination at Cuddesdon College and was ordained deacon in 1934 and priest in 1935.

After a curacy in Pimlico at St Gabriel's, Warwick Square (1934-35) and Curate-in-charge at All Saints, Grosvenor Road (1936-39) he was Rector of Holy Trinity, Ayr from 1939 until 1947 (a period which encompassed wartime service in the RNVR). He was awarded the DSC in 1944. He was then Vicar of St Paul's Church, Knightsbridge from 1947 until his elevation to the suffragan bishopric of Tewkesbury in 1955, translation to Bath See following in 1960. He was consecrated a bishop on 11 June 1955, by Geoffrey Fisher, Archbishop of Canterbury, at St Paul's Cathedral. After 15 years at Bath, he resigned to begin retirement in Somerset.

References

1910 births
1986 deaths
People educated at Radley College
Alumni of Trinity College, Cambridge
Royal Naval Volunteer Reserve personnel of World War II
Bishops of Tewkesbury
Bishops of Bath and Wells
20th-century Church of England bishops